House Arrest is a 2021 Russian comedy drama film directed by Aleksey German Jr. In June 2021, the film was selected to compete in the Un Certain Regard section at the 2021 Cannes Film Festival.

Cast
Merab Ninidze as David
Svetlana Khodchenkova as Nadya
Aleksandra Bortich as Ira
Aleksandr Pal as Investigator
Anna Mikhalkova as Anna

Reception
Wendy Ide of Screen Daily wrote "The film has a charismatic and textured central character who widens the scope of a picture which rarely strays beyond the confines of a cluttered, claustrophobic apartment".

References

External links

2021 comedy-drama films
2020s Russian-language films
Russian comedy-drama films
Films directed by Aleksei Alekseivich German